Heinz Richter  may refer to:

 Heinz Richter (engineer) (1909–1971), engineer and author
 Heinz Richter (born 1939), German historian
 Heinz Richter (cyclist) (born 1947)